Michael Movsesi Poghosyan (sometimes credited as Mikael Pogosyan, Michael Poghosian, Mikael Poghosyan, ; born 31 May 1954) is an Armenian film and theatre actor, as well as a judge on the Armenian version of Pop Idol.

Professional practice
In 1978, he graduated from the Acting Department of Yerevan Fine Arts and Theatre Institute. He had worked in the Yerevan Chamber Theatre from 1976 to 91 and in the Hamazgayin Yerevan Drama Theatre from 1992 to 94. Poghosyan was actor of Armenfilm Studio between 1978 and 1992.

Selected filmography
Earthquake (2016)
Lost & Found in Armenia (2012) as Grandpa Matsak
If Only Everyone (2012) as Gurgen
Symphony of Silence (2001) as Kondi Gzho
The Merry Bus (2001) as Uncle Khoren
Yerevan Blues (1998) as Hapetik/Policeman/Sparapet/Indian Ambassador/Theatre Fireman
Khatabalada (1997) as Hamazasp
Yerevan Jan (1999) 
The Voice in the Wilderness (1991) as Tomazo
Deadline in Seven Days (1991) as Mikael Poghosyan
Wind of Oblivion (1990) as Mikael Poghosyan
Taynyy sovetnik (1989) as Mikael Poghosyan
Three of Us (1988)
The Last Sunday (1986) as Armen
Snowdrops and Edelweiss (1982) as Zhikharev

References

External links
 Official site (English, requires Flash)
 

Armenian male film actors
Male actors from Yerevan
Living people
1954 births